The United Nations Association of the United States of America (UNA-USA) is a nonprofit grassroots organization dedicated to promoting political and public support for the United Nations among Americans. A program of the United Nations Foundation, its mission includes advocating for greater U.S. leadership at the UN, improving and enhancing the UN system, and implementing the Sustainable Development Goals and the UN Charter in both the U.S. and globally.

UNA-USA's activities include public outreach, political lobbying, and community organizing. It hosts youth programs, fellowships, and networking events both locally and nationally. Its flagship events include the Global Engagement Summit at the UN Headquarters in New York City and the Leadership Summit in Washington, D.C. UNA-USA is led by an executive director and governed by a thirty-member national council that meets semi-annually.

Along with its sister organization, the Better World Campaign, UNA-USA is the world's largest UN advocacy network. As of 2020, it has over 20,000 members across more than 200 chapters in cities and universities nationwide; the majority of members are under age of twenty-six. It is a member of the World Federation of United Nations Associations, which comprises other national UN advocacy organizations.

History 
The United Nations Association of the United States (UNA-USA) was founded in the midst of World War Two, in order to build American support for a new international organization designed to sustain the peace once the war was won. It considered itself the direct successor of the League of Nations Association, which was founded in 1923. At that time, the term "United Nations" referred to the allied nations fighting against fascism, but some leaders had already begun to embrace it as the brand name for a new international organization. UNA-USA's first major initiative was a nationwide tour by a bipartisan group of Congressional leaders, including then Senator Harry Truman, to promote public support for a Congressional resolution for the US to become a member of a postwar organization of "free and sovereign nations." The resolution, sponsored by Texas Senator Thomas Connally, was adopted with broad bipartisan support in November 1943 giving the Roosevelt administration the mandate it needed to launch the San Francisco Conference where the UN Charter was ultimately signed in 1945.

At the San Francisco Conference, the association (renamed in 1945 as the American Association for the United Nations) served as Secretariat for a coalition of 42 national organizations who were appointed by the State Department to provide input into the negotiations. These 42 "Consultants," which included such diverse organizations as the NAACP and the American Association of University Women, played a key role in ensuring that the Charter included both a mandate to advance human rights and a provision allowing for the formal participation of civil society organizations in UN deliberations.

When former First Lady of the United States Eleanor Roosevelt completed her term as a US Representative to the UN General Assembly in 1953, she walked into the association's New York office and volunteered to help. This was the quiet beginning of a major campaign in which Mrs. Roosevelt carried the message of UN across the country through personal appearances, recruitment speeches, and fundraising efforts. Mrs. Roosevelt was instrumental in building the association's national network of chapters on college campuses and in communities across the US, an effort that continue until her death in 1962.

In 1964, UNA-USA (then still operating under the AAUN name) merged with the US Committee for the United Nations, a group composed of 138 national organizations supporting the work of the United Nations. The newly merged organization returned to the original UNA-USA name. Over the next forty years, UNA-USA would complement its grassroots mission by conducting groundbreaking policy research, convening track two diplomacy with the Soviet Union, and promoting Model UN education programs at home and abroad.

In 2011, UNA-USA merged with the United Nations Foundation combining the association's grassroots network and public engagement capacity with the foundation's advocacy resources and global convening power. The merger created the largest network of UN advocates worldwide.

UNA-USA's Programs 

Programs at the UN - UNA-USA's Global Engagement Summit hosted at the UN each year in February convenes over 1,500 Americans to engage with UN leaders, from the Secretary-General to Ambassadors of UN member nations, explore the top issues on the global agenda, elevate a diverse range of American voices, and equip UNA-USA members to be leaders on international cooperation in their communities throughout the year. In addition, UNA-USA members are eligible to attend a wide range of UN events throughout the year including the Conference on the Status of Women (CSW) to the UN Civil Society Forum.

Programs in DC - UNA-USA's Global Leadership Summit hosted in Washington each year in June gathers over 500 chapter leaders, members, and partners to share best practices on advocating for the UN and advancing the SDG's. The summit culminates with UNA-USA's lobby day when advocates converge on Capitol Hill to demonstrate that our country is stronger when we don't go it alone.

Programs Throughout the Country - UNA-USA chapters host events throughout the year to elevate important issues where the UN plays a critical role, from humanitarian assistance to climate change, and to celebrate local leaders who are advancing global priorities such as the UN's Sustainable Development Goals. These events are frequently tied to major International Celebration Days such as International Women's Day, Earth Day, and Human Rights Day and often feature community leaders, such as human trafficking task force members or private sector sustainability champions, whose local mission has a global impact. Throughout the month of October, UNA-USA chapters host over 200 events to celebrate the anniversary of the UN's founding (October 24).

Education Outreach - Many UNA-USA chapters also partner with local school districts to host or support Model UN programs. In addition, UNA-USA provides free online teaching materials to enable teachers to put kids who may never hold a passport into the shoes of a diplomat by transforming their classrooms in to UN Security Council negotiations.

Seton Hall Partnership - Since 1997, UNA-USA has partnered with Seton Hall's School of Diplomacy and International Relations, one of the nation's top professional schools of international affairs, to host a wide range of collaborative programs. Every summer, UNA-USA and Seton Hall host graduate students from around the world for a "UN Intensive" course in New York featuring interactive sessions with UN leaders. UNA-USA also hosts the Seton Hall Washington Semester Program and works throughout the year to connect faculty and students to opportunities to participate in UN events.

Membership 
UNA-USA has more than 200 chapters in communities and on college campuses across the country and over 20,000 members (60% under the age of 25). These members carry out programs and advocacy campaigns at the local level through a wide range of programs and events.

Councils 

The UNA-USA National Council is an elected body of UNA-USA volunteer leaders which guides the organization's mission and work. Consisting of 30 representatives elected on a regional basis the National Council meets twice a year to make recommendations on advocacy and other program priorities.

See also
United Nations Foundation
United Nations

Notes

References

External links 
UNA-USA homepage
The World Federation of United Nations Associations

World Federation of United Nations Associations
United States and the United Nations